Worikambo is a town in the Garu-Tempane district in the Upper East region of Ghana.

Facilities 

 Worikambo Health Center
 Worikambo Catholic Junior High School
 Worikambo Primary School

Notable natives 

 Suleman Adamu Sanid
 Idana Asigri

References 

Populated places in the Upper East Region